Events from the year 1521 in Ireland.

Incumbent
Lord: Henry VIII

Events
 George Cromer (died 1543) was appointed (Church of Ireland) Archbishop of Armagh and Primate of All Ireland under Henry VIII.

Births

Deaths
29 November – William Rokeby, a leading statesman and cleric in the early sixteenth-century, who held the offices of Bishop of Meath, Archbishop of Dublin and Lord Chancellor of Ireland.

References

 
1520s in Ireland
Ireland
Years of the 16th century in Ireland